is the debut studio album by Japanese pop band Pizzicato Five. The album was released on April 1, 1987 by CBS/Sony.

Couples was reissued on November 1, 1995, along with an instrumental version of the album entitled A Quiet Couple. On August 24, 2016, a remastered edition of Couples was released, which peaked at number 49 on the Oricon Albums Chart.

Track listing

Charts

References

External links
 

1987 debut albums
Pizzicato Five albums
Sony Music Entertainment Japan albums
Japanese-language albums